Gaongo is a department or commune of Bazèga Province in central Burkina Faso. Its capital lies at the town of Gaongo. According to the 1996 census the department has a total population of 23,751.

Towns and villages
 Gaongo (capital) DouabaDassamkandéGomasgoKombougoNafbangaNakomestingaNeblaboumbouSomassiTambiliTanwokoVosséWardogo

References

Departments of Burkina Faso
Bazèga Province